Seven Ages of Britain is a BBC television documentary series written and presented by David Dimbleby. The seven part series was first aired on Sunday nights at 9:00pm on BBC One starting on 31 January 2010.

The series covers the history of Britain's greatest art and artefacts over the past 2000 years. Each episode covers a different period in British history. In Australia, all seven episodes aired on ABC1 each Tuesday at 8:30pm from 7 September 2010.

Production 
Originally the series was to air in late 2009, but was later rescheduled to early 2010. The HD edition of the show aired on BBC HD and repeats aired on BBC Two.

In Summer 2009 artist Nathaniel Mellors was commissioned by the BBC to make a short "work of modern art" to introduce the final episode of the series. The resultant work The Seven Ages of Britain Teaser features Dimbleby voicing a silicon mask cast from his own face, alongside actors Gwendoline Christie ( as 'The Operator') and Johnny Vivash (as 'Kadmus').

Episodes

2003 Channel 4 series by the same title 
Channel 4 had previously aired a series by the same title but covering a broader time period in 2003, presented by Bettany Hughes. The series has since been picked up by the Discovery Channel.

References

External links 
 
 Seven Ages of Britain at the Open University

2010 British television series debuts
2010 British television series endings
2010s British documentary television series
BBC television documentaries about history during the 16th and 17th centuries
English-language television shows
BBC television documentaries about history during the 18th and 19th centuries
BBC television documentaries about history during the 20th Century
BBC television documentaries about history during the 21st Century
BBC television documentaries about medieval history
BBC television documentaries about prehistoric and ancient history